The montane myotis (Myotis oxyotus) is a species of vesper bat. It is found in Bolivia, Colombia, Costa Rica, Ecuador, Panama, Peru, and Venezuela.

References

Mouse-eared bats
Mammals of Bolivia
Mammals of Colombia
Mammals of Ecuador
Mammals of Peru
Mammals of Venezuela
Taxonomy articles created by Polbot
Mammals described in 1867
Bats of Central America
Bats of South America
Taxa named by Wilhelm Peters